Chiasmini is a tribe of leafhoppers in the subfamily Deltocephalinae. Chiasmini contains 21 genera and over 300 species. Some species of Chiasmini in the genus Nephotettix are agricultural pests and transmit rice Tungrovirus in southeast Asia.

Genera 
There are currently 21 described genera in Chiasmini:

References 

Deltocephalinae
Insect tribes